The Stonehill Skyhawks men's basketball team, known previously as the Stonehill Chieftains, represents Stonehill College in Easton, Massachusetts, United States. The Skyhawks currently compete in the Division I Northeast Conference on July 1, 2022. Due to the NCAA's policy on reclassifying programs, the Skyhawks will not be eligible to compete in the NCAA tournament or the NIT until the 2026–27 season.

The team is currently led by 8th year head coach Chris Kraus and play their home games at Merkert Gymnasium.

Postseason results

NCAA Division II Tournament results
The Skyhawks appeared in the NCAA Division II tournament fifteen times. Their combined record was 14–14.

See also
Stonehill Skyhawks women's basketball

References

External links
Website